In probability theory and statistics, a Gaussian process is a stochastic process (a collection of random variables indexed by time or space), such that every finite collection of those random variables has a multivariate normal distribution, i.e. every finite linear combination of them is normally distributed. The distribution of a Gaussian process is the joint distribution of all those (infinitely many) random variables, and as such, it is a distribution over functions with a continuous domain, e.g. time or space.

The concept of Gaussian processes is named after Carl Friedrich Gauss because it is based on the notion of the Gaussian distribution (normal distribution). Gaussian processes can be seen as an infinite-dimensional generalization of multivariate normal distributions.

Gaussian processes are useful in statistical modelling, benefiting from properties inherited from the normal distribution. For example, if a random process is modelled as a Gaussian process, the distributions of various derived quantities can be obtained explicitly. Such quantities include the average value of the process over a range of times and the error in estimating the average using sample values at a small set of times. While exact models often scale poorly as the amount of data increases, multiple approximation methods have been developed which often retain good accuracy while drastically reducing computation time.

Definition
A time continuous stochastic process  is Gaussian if and only if for every finite set of indices  in the index set 

is a multivariate Gaussian random variable. That is the same as saying every linear combination of  has a univariate normal (or Gaussian) distribution.

Using characteristic functions of random variables, the Gaussian property can be formulated as follows:  is Gaussian if and only if, for every finite set of indices , there are real-valued ,  with  such that the following equality holds for all 

where  denotes the imaginary unit such that .

The numbers  and  can be shown to be the covariances and means of the variables in the process.

Variance
The variance of a Gaussian process is finite at any time , formally

Stationarity
For general stochastic processes strict-sense stationarity implies wide-sense stationarity but not every wide-sense stationary stochastic process is strict-sense stationary. However, for a Gaussian stochastic process the two concepts are equivalent.

A Gaussian stochastic process is strict-sense stationary if, and only if, it is wide-sense stationary.

Example
There is an explicit representation for stationary Gaussian processes.  A simple example of this representation is

Covariance functions

A key fact of Gaussian processes is that they can be completely defined by their second-order statistics. Thus, if a Gaussian process is assumed to have mean zero, defining the covariance function completely defines the process' behaviour. Importantly the non-negative definiteness of  this function enables its spectral decomposition using the Karhunen–Loève expansion. Basic aspects that can be defined through the covariance function are the process' stationarity, isotropy, smoothness and periodicity.

For example, the Ornstein–Uhlenbeck process is stationary.

A process that is concurrently stationary and isotropic is considered to be homogeneous; in practice these properties reflect the differences (or rather the lack of them) in the behaviour of the process given the location of the observer.

Ultimately Gaussian processes translate as taking priors on functions and the smoothness of these priors can be induced by the covariance function. If we wish to allow for significant displacement then we might choose a rougher covariance function. Extreme examples of the behaviour is the Ornstein–Uhlenbeck covariance function and the squared exponential where the former is never differentiable and the latter infinitely differentiable.

Periodicity refers to inducing periodic patterns within the behaviour of the process. Formally, this is achieved by mapping the input  to a two dimensional vector .

Usual covariance functions

There are a number of common covariance functions:
Constant : 
Linear: 
white Gaussian noise: 
Squared exponential: 
Ornstein–Uhlenbeck: 
Matérn: 
Periodic: 
Rational quadratic: 

Here . The parameter  is the characteristic length-scale of the process (practically, "how close" two points  and  have to be to influence each other significantly),  is the Kronecker delta and  the standard deviation of the noise fluctuations. Importantly, a complicated covariance function can be defined as a linear combination of other simpler covariance functions in order to incorporate different insights about the data-set at hand.

The inferential results are dependent on the values of the hyperparameters  (e.g.  and ) defining the model's behaviour. If the prior is very near uniform, this is the same as maximizing the marginal likelihood of the process; the  marginalization being done over the observed process values . This approach is also known as maximum likelihood II, evidence maximization, or empirical Bayes.

Continuity

For a Gaussian process, continuity in probability is equivalent to mean-square continuity,
and continuity with probability one is equivalent to sample continuity.
The latter implies, but is not implied by, continuity in probability.
Continuity in probability holds if and only if the mean and autocovariance are continuous functions. In contrast, sample continuity was challenging even for stationary Gaussian processes (as probably noted first by Andrey Kolmogorov), and more challenging for more general processes.

As usual, by a sample continuous process one means a process that admits a sample continuous modification.

Stationary case

For a stationary Gaussian process  some conditions on its spectrum are sufficient for sample continuity, but fail to be necessary. A necessary and sufficient condition, sometimes called Dudley–Fernique theorem, involves the function  defined by

(the right-hand side does not depend on  due to stationarity). Convergence of the following integrals matters:

these two integrals being equal according to integration by substitution   The first integrand need not be bounded as  thus the integral may converge or diverge. Taking for example  for large  that is,  for small  one obtains  when  and  when 
In these two cases the function  is increasing on  but generally it is not. Moreover, the condition

Some history.
Sufficiency was announced by Xavier Fernique in 1964, but the first proof was published by Richard M. Dudley in 1967.
Necessity was proved by Michael B. Marcus and Lawrence Shepp in 1970.

There exist sample continuous processes  such that  they violate condition (*). An example found by Marcus and Shepp  is a random lacunary Fourier series

where  are independent random variables with standard normal distribution; frequencies  are a fast growing sequence; and coefficients  satisfy  The latter relation implies  whence  almost surely, which ensures uniform convergence of the Fourier series almost surely, and sample continuity of 

Its autocovariation function

is nowhere monotone (see the picture), as well as the corresponding function

Brownian motion as the integral of Gaussian processes
A Wiener process (also known as Brownian motion) is the integral of a white noise generalized Gaussian process. It is not stationary, but it has stationary increments.

The Ornstein–Uhlenbeck process is a stationary Gaussian process.

The Brownian bridge is (like the Ornstein–Uhlenbeck process) an example of a Gaussian process whose increments are not independent.

The fractional Brownian motion is a Gaussian process whose covariance function is a generalisation of that of the Wiener process.

Driscoll's zero-one law

Driscoll's zero-one law is a result characterizing the sample functions generated by a Gaussian process.

Let  be a mean-zero Gaussian process  with non-negative definite covariance function . Let  be a Reproducing kernel Hilbert space with positive definite kernel .

Then

Moreover, 

implies 

This has significant implications when , as

As such, almost all sample paths of a mean-zero Gaussian process with positive definite kernel  will lie outside of the Hilbert space .

Linearly constrained Gaussian processes
For many applications of interest some pre-existing knowledge about the system at hand is already given. Consider e.g. the case where the output of the Gaussian process corresponds to a magnetic field; here, the real magnetic field is bound by Maxwell's equations and a way to incorporate this constraint into the Gaussian process formalism would be desirable as this would likely improve the accuracy of the algorithm.

A method on how to incorporate linear constraints into Gaussian processes already exists:

Consider the (vector valued) output function  which is known to obey the linear constraint (i.e.  is a linear operator)

Then the constraint  can be fulfilled by choosing , where  is modelled as a Gaussian process, and finding  such that 

Given  and using the fact that Gaussian processes are closed under linear transformations, the Gaussian process for  obeying constraint  becomes

Hence, linear constraints can be encoded into the mean and covariance function of a Gaussian process.

Applications

A Gaussian process can be used as a prior probability distribution over functions in Bayesian inference. Given any set of N points in the desired domain of your functions, take a multivariate Gaussian whose covariance matrix parameter is the Gram matrix of your N points with some desired kernel, and sample from that Gaussian.  For solution of the multi-output prediction problem, Gaussian process regression for vector-valued function was developed. In this method, a 'big' covariance is constructed, which describes the correlations between all the input and output variables taken in N points  in the desired domain. This approach was elaborated in detail for the matrix-valued Gaussian processes and generalised to processes with 'heavier tails' like Student-t processes.

Inference of continuous values with a Gaussian process prior is known as Gaussian process regression, or kriging; extending Gaussian process regression to multiple target variables is known as cokriging. Gaussian processes are thus useful as a powerful non-linear multivariate interpolation tool.

Gaussian processes are also commonly used to tackle numerical analysis problems such as numerical integration, solving differential equations, or optimisation in the field of probabilistic numerics.

Gaussian processes can also be used in the context of mixture of experts models, for example. The underlying rationale of such a learning framework consists in the assumption that a given mapping cannot be well captured by a single Gaussian process model. Instead, the observation space is divided into subsets, each of which is characterized by a different mapping function; each of these is learned via a different Gaussian process component in the postulated mixture.

Gaussian process prediction, or Kriging

When concerned with a general Gaussian process regression problem (Kriging), it is assumed that for a Gaussian process  observed at coordinates , the vector of values  is just one sample from a multivariate Gaussian distribution of dimension equal to number of observed coordinates . Therefore, under the assumption of a zero-mean distribution, where  is the covariance matrix between all possible pairs  for a given set of hyperparameters θ.
As such the log marginal likelihood is:

and maximizing this marginal likelihood towards  provides the complete specification of the Gaussian process . One can briefly note at this point that the first term corresponds to a penalty term for a model's failure to fit observed values and the second term to a penalty term that increases proportionally to a model's complexity. Having specified , making predictions about unobserved values  at coordinates  is then only a matter of drawing samples from the predictive distribution  where the posterior mean estimate  is defined as

and the posterior variance estimate B is defined as:

A known bottleneck in Gaussian process prediction is that the computational complexity of inference and likelihood evaluation is cubic in the number of points |x|, and as such can become unfeasible for larger data sets. Works on sparse Gaussian processes, that usually are based on the idea of building a representative set for the given process f, try to circumvent this issue. The kriging method can be used in the latent level of a nonlinear mixed-effects model for a spatial functional prediction: this technique is called the latent kriging.

Often, the covariance has the form , where  is a scaling parameter. Examples are the Matérn class covariance functions.

Bayesian neural networks as Gaussian processes 

Bayesian neural networks are a particular type of Bayesian network that results from treating deep learning and artificial neural network models probabilistically, and assigning a prior distribution to their parameters. Computation in artificial neural networks is usually organized into sequential layers of artificial neurons. The number of neurons in a layer is called the layer width. As layer width grows large, many Bayesian neural networks reduce to a Gaussian process with a closed form compositional kernel. This Gaussian process is called the Neural Network Gaussian Process (NNGP). It allows predictions from Bayesian neural networks to be more efficiently evaluated, and provides an analytic tool to understand deep learning models.

Computational issues 

In practical applications, Gaussian process models are often evaluated on a grid leading to multivariate normal distributions. Using these models for prediction or parameter estimation using maximum likelihood requires evaluating a multivariate Gaussian density, which involves calculating the determinant and the inverse of the covariance matrix. Both of these operations have cubic computational complexity which means that even for grids of modest sizes, both operations can have a prohibitive computational cost. This drawback led to the development of multiple approximation methods.

See also
 Bayes linear statistics
 Bayesian interpretation of regularization
 Kriging
 Gaussian free field
 Gauss–Markov process
 Gradient-enhanced kriging (GEK)
 Student's t-process

References

External links
 The Gaussian Processes Web Site, including the text of Rasmussen and Williams' Gaussian Processes for Machine Learning
 A gentle introduction to Gaussian processes
 A Review of Gaussian Random Fields and Correlation Functions
 Efficient Reinforcement Learning using Gaussian Processes

Software

 GPML: A comprehensive Matlab toolbox for GP regression and classification
 STK: a Small (Matlab/Octave) Toolbox for Kriging and GP modeling
 Kriging module in UQLab framework (Matlab)
 Matlab/Octave function for stationary Gaussian fields
 Yelp MOE – A black box optimization engine using Gaussian process learning
 ooDACE – A flexible object-oriented Kriging Matlab toolbox.
 GPstuff – Gaussian process toolbox for Matlab and Octave
 GPy – A Gaussian processes framework in Python
 GSTools - A geostatistical toolbox, including Gaussian process regression, written in Python
 Interactive Gaussian process regression demo
 Basic Gaussian process library written in C++11
 scikit-learn – A machine learning library for Python which includes Gaussian process regression and classification
  - The Kriging toolKit (KriKit) is developed at the Institute of Bio- and Geosciences 1 (IBG-1) of Forschungszentrum Jülich (FZJ)

Video tutorials
 Gaussian Process Basics by David MacKay
 Learning with Gaussian Processes by Carl Edward Rasmussen
 Bayesian inference and Gaussian processes by Carl Edward Rasmussen

Stochastic processes
Kernel methods for machine learning
Nonparametric Bayesian statistics
Normal distribution